Baychunas (also known as Bayshonas (Beyshunas, بەيشۋناس)) is a town in Atyrau Region, southwest Kazakhstan. It has a population of 1,864.

References

Atyrau Region
Cities and towns in Kazakhstan